The Brontë Waterfall is a small waterfall located about a mile south-west of Stanbury, near Haworth, West Yorkshire, England.  The area surrounding the waterfall is mainly moorland and farmland but is part of Brontë Country.  It is an area of outstanding beauty and famous for its association with the Brontë sisters. Below the falls can be found an old stone bridge named Brontë Bridge across South Dean Beck. The bridge was destroyed in a flash flood in May 1989 and rebuilt in 1990.

Brontë trail 
There is a nature trail called the Brontë Trail starting from Haworth and running over the moors to the waterfall.  Continuing on, Top Withens can be reached within the same walk.  This is a ruined farmhouse said to have been the inspiration for Wuthering Heights house in the 1847 Emily Brontë novel.

A flash flood in May 1989, swept away the stone bridge that crossed the beck beneath the falls. In March 1990, a Lynx helicopter from No. 9 Regiment Army Air Corps, airlifted five gritstone slabs into the narrow valley to allow park rangers to repair the crossing.

See also
 Brontë Parsonage Museum

References

External links
 Website for Haworth relating to the Brontë waterfall walk
 Web news magazine of the Brontë Parsonage Museum

Tourist attractions in the City of Bradford
Waterfalls of England
Brontë family